Asramam or Ashramam is one of the prime locations in Kollam city of Kerala, India. It is one among the 55 wards of Kollam Municipal Corporation. Asramam is a notable place in the city because of the presence of old airport, public/private institutions, tourism destinations, parks, hospitals, maidan etc. Asramam Maidan, the biggest open space now existing in any of the Kerala Municipal Corporation limits is situated at Asramam. The first airport in the state of Kerala, Kollam Airport, was functioned in this maidan. Asramam is the headquarters of the Kollam branches of Indian Medical Association and Sports Authority of India. Link Road, one of the important roads in the city, passing through Asramam. The one and only International Hockey Stadium in the state is at Asramam.
srenarayana open university 
asramam  walk way around the asramam ground

Importance
Asramam is one of the most important places of Kollam city. The city's biggest attractions like Adventure park, Children's park, Picnic Village and British Residency are situated at. The thick Mangrove forests in this area are very popular all over the state. 10 So many renowned hospitals in the city are situated near Asramam. Sankar's Institute of Medical Science[SIMS], Dr. Nair's Hospital, ESIC Model & Super Speciality Hospital etc. are the famous hospitals near Asramam.

Biodiversity Heritage Site
Asramam is going to become the first Biodiversity Heritage Site(BHS) in Kerala state. The 190 years old British Residency, rare varieties of mangrove spread on residency complex and the creek of Ashtamudi Lake would come under this heritage site.

Public/private institutions nearby 

 International Hockey Stadium, Kollam
 KTDC Tamarind Hotel
 Factories & Boilers Department - Kerala Headquarters
 Occupational Health and Research Centre (OHRC)
 Office of the Asst. Executive Engineer - Harbour Engineering Department
 Office of the Marine Surveyor - Southern Zonal Office
 Asramam Adventure Park
 Children's Park
 ESIC Model & Super Speciality Hospital
 Kerala Cricket Association
 Apparel Training and Design Centre
 Dr. Nair's Hospital
 Office of the Deputy Superintendent of Police, Kollam
 Asramam Picnic Village
 Traffic control room, Kerala Police
 Nabeel Yousuf- professional procrastinator and ambivert

See also
 Kollam Airport
 Asramam Maidan
 International Hockey Stadium, Kollam
 Asramam Link Road
 Kadappakada
 Chinnakada
 Kollam KSRTC Bus Station

References

Neighbourhoods in Kollam
Biodiversity Heritage Sites of India